Roundton Hill is a rounded, steep sided,  hill, volcanic in origin, in the easternmost part of old Montgomeryshire (in present day-Powys), Wales, which juts into the English border near Church Stoke. It is managed as a nature reserve by the Montgomeryshire Wildlife Trust, who acquired it in 1985.

Archaeology
There was once an Iron Age hillfort here. The vantage point offers views across the surrounding countryside, with views of Corndon Hill to the north, as well as the Cambrian Mountains to the west. Lead and Barytes mines run into the hill, and are today used as a roost by Horseshoe and Daubenton's bats. Having avoided the plough, the hill's steep rocky slopes still support plants such as the mountain pansy, which has long since disappeared from most of the hills in mid-Wales. The reserve was made a Site of Special Scientific Interest (SSSI) in 1986.

See also
List of hillforts in Wales

References 

Hillforts in Powys
Mountains and hills of Powys
Nature reserves in Wales
Volcanism of Wales
Iron Age Britain
Extinct volcanism
Sites of Special Scientific Interest notified in 1986